New Brunswick Development Corporation (DEVCO) is a 501(c)(3) non-profit urban real estate development organization created in the mid-1970s to initiate redevelopment projects and to serve as the vehicle for public and private investment in the City of New Brunswick and other New Jersey urban communities. Since its inception, Devco has overseen more than $3 billion in investment to aid in economic revitalization in New Brunswick as well as redevelopment projects in Atlantic City, Newark, and Paterson.

History
New Brunswick Development Corporation was founded as a nonprofit, tax-exempt redevelopment corporation by Richard B. Sellars, a former executive at Johnson & Johnson, in the late 1970s. The corporation's mission at the time was to act as a catalyst for public and private investment to spur economic development and revitalization efforts in the City. Its first major project was a $6 million renovation of a Hyatt Regency Hotel, which was backed Johnson & Johnson.

Since its foundation, the corporation has been associated with Middlesex County politicians and government officials including Mayor James M. Cahill, former Mayor and State Senator John A. Lynch Jr. and Chairman of New Brunswick Development Corporation George Zoffinger.

Projects 

 Rutgers Cancer Institute of New Jersey   
 Blanquita Valenti Elementary School 
 Stockton Island Campus, Atlantic City 
 National Park Service Visitor Center, City of Paterson 
 New Brunswick Performing Arts Center Redevelopment 
 Rutgers College Avenue Campus Redevelopment 
 Wellness Plaza
 Gateway Transit Village/The Vue 
 The Heldrich Redevelopment Project
 New Brunswick High School 
 Rockoff Hall Student Apartment 
 Rutgers Liberty Plaza
New Brunswick Performing Arts Center

References

Non-profit organizations based in New Jersey
New Brunswick, New Jersey